Sybrand Abraham Engelbrecht (born 15 September 1988) is a South African cricketer.

Engelbrecht was born in Johannesburg.  He is a right-hand allrounder who bats in the middle-order and bowls offspin. He made his first-class debut for Northerns in October 2007 and scored 45 and took four wickets against North West in the Provincial Challenge. He made an impact during the Under-19 World Cup in Malaysia in 2008 with his stunning fielding at point and took catches that drew comparison with Jonty Rhodes.He currently plays for Cape Cobras. He was replaced instead of JP Duminy for the 2014 Champions League Twenty20. He was included in the South Western Districts cricket team for the 2015 Africa T20 Cup.

References

External links
 Sybrand Engelbrecht Cricinfo

1988 births
Living people
Cape Cobras cricketers
South African cricketers
Western Province cricketers